Iliatenco  is a city and seat of the municipality of Iliatenco, in the state of Guerrero, south-western Mexico.

References

Populated places in Guerrero